The McGranahan Portion of the Chisholm Trail Roadbed is a remnant of the Chisholm Trail, a cattle trail that ran north–south between Texas and Kansas through the Indian Territory. It is the only portion of the Chisholm Trail through Oklahoma listed on the National Register.

The remnant is located near Yukon, Oklahoma, in northeastern Canadian County, and was listed on the National Register of Historic Places in 2013. It was most likely used for supporting wagon traffic for the cattle drives.

Much of the land that composed the Chisholm Trail was  homesteaded and evidence of the millions of head of cattle driven over the route was lost. However, this piece of land survived and was preserved. James McGranahan purchased it in 1895 and the McGranahan family continues to own it.

References

Historic trails and roads in Oklahoma
Trails and roads in the American Old West
Roads on the National Register of Historic Places in Oklahoma
National Register of Historic Places in Canadian County, Oklahoma